Morocco competed at the 2014 Summer Youth Olympics, in Nanjing, China from 16 August to 28 August 2014.

Athletics

Morocco qualified seven athletes.

Qualification Legend: Q=Final A (medal); qB=Final B (non-medal); qC=Final C (non-medal); qD=Final D (non-medal); qE=Final E (non-medal)

Boys
Track & road events

Girls
Track & road events

Cycling

Morocco qualified a boys' team based on its ranking issued by the UCI.

Team

Mixed Relay

Equestrian

Morocco qualified a rider.

Gymnastics

Artistic Gymnastics

Morocco qualified one athlete based on its performance at the 2014 African Artistic Gymnastics Championships.

Boys

Rhythmic Gymnastics

Morocco qualified one athlete based on its performance at the 2014 African Rhythmic Championships.

Individual

Taekwondo

Morocco qualified one athlete based on its performance at the Taekwondo Qualification Tournament.

Boys

Weightlifting

Morocco qualified 1 quota in the boys' and girls' events based on the team ranking after the 2014 Weightlifting Junior & Youth African Championships.

Boys

Girls

See also
Morocco at the 2014 Winter Olympics

References

2014 in Moroccan sport
Nations at the 2014 Summer Youth Olympics
Morocco at the Youth Olympics